The Franklin County School District is a public school district based in Meadville, Mississippi (USA). The district's boundaries parallel that of Franklin County.

History
In 1958 Roxie High School's administration disallowed the display of the United States flag, getting criticism from John Farese, a member of the Mississippi House of Representatives.

Schools
Franklin High School (Grades 9-12)
Franklin Middle School (Grades 7-8)
Franklin Upper Elementary School (Grades 4-6)
Franklin Lower Elementary School (Grades PK-3)

Demographics

2006-07 school year
There were a total of 1,510 students enrolled in the Franklin County School District during the 2006–2007 school year. The gender makeup of the district was 47% female and 53% male. The racial makeup of the district was 46.42% African American, 53.44% White, 0.07% Hispanic, and 0.07% Native American. 58.9% of the district's students were eligible to receive free lunch.

Previous school years

Accountability statistics

See also
List of school districts in Mississippi

References

External links

Education in Franklin County, Mississippi
School districts in Mississippi